Tresco may refer to:

 Tresco, Elizabeth Bay, a historic residence in New South Wales, Australia
 Tresco, Isles of Scilly, an island off Cornwall, England, United Kingdom
 Tresco, Victoria, a town in Victoria, Australia
 a nickname referring to the cricketer Marcus Trescothick